An election was held on 6 June 2009 for Members of the European Parliament from Cyprus.

Results

References

European Parliament Elections 2009 covered by KyproEkloges.com

Cyprus
European Parliament elections in Cyprus

2009 in Cyprus
2000s in Cypriot politics